The U.S. Kefauver–Harris Amendment or "Drug Efficacy Amendment" is a 1962 amendment to the Federal Food, Drug, and Cosmetic Act.

It introduced a requirement for drug manufacturers to provide proof of the effectiveness and safety of their drugs before approval, required drug advertising to disclose accurate information about side effects, and stopped cheap generic drugs being marketed as expensive drugs under new trade names as new "breakthrough" medications.

Background
The amendment was a response to the thalidomide tragedy, in which thousands of children were born with birth defects as a result of their mothers taking thalidomide for morning sickness during pregnancy. The bill by U.S. Senator Estes Kefauver, of Tennessee, and U.S. Representative Oren Harris, of Arkansas, required drug manufacturers to provide proof of the effectiveness and safety of their drugs before approval. The majority of the tragic birth defects that occurred were in other countries because Thalidomide had not been approved for use in the United States. However, samples were distributed to physicians in the US and 17 birth defects were attributed to its use. Frances Oldham Kelsey was the FDA reviewer who refused to approve Thalidomide for use.

It introduced a "proof-of-efficacy" requirement for the first time. In addition, the Amendment required drug advertising to disclose accurate information about side effects and efficacy of treatments. Finally, cheap generic drugs could no longer be marketed as expensive drugs under new trade names as new "breakthrough" medications.

The law was signed by President John F. Kennedy on October 10, 1962.

Effect
The Kefauver–Harris Amendment strengthened the U.S. Food and Drug Administration's control of experimentation on humans and changed the way new drugs are approved and regulated. Before the Thalidomide scandal in Europe, and Canada, U.S. drug companies only had to show their new products were safe. After the passage of the Amendment, an FDA New Drug Application (NDA) would have to show that a new drug was both safe and effective (previously the 1938 Food, Drug and Cosmetic Act was the main law that regulated drug safety). Informed consent was required of patients participating in clinical trials, and adverse drug reactions were required to be reported to the FDA.

The Drug Efficacy Study Implementation was begun to classify all pre-1962 drugs that were already on the market as either effective, ineffective, or needing further study.

Estes Kefauver considered the Amendment his "finest achievement" in consumer protection.

Louis Lasagna, then a prominent clinical pharmacologist at the Johns Hopkins School of Medicine, advised Congress about the proper conduct of clinical research during the 1962 hearings leading up to passage of the Amendment.

The law also exempted from the "Delaney clause" (a 1958 amendment to the Food, Drugs, and Cosmetic Act of 1938) certain animal drugs and animal feed additives shown to induce cancer, but which left no detectable levels of residue in the human food supply.

See also

References

Sources

 Abood, R.R., & Brushwood, D.B. (1994). Pharmacy practice and the law. Gaithersburg, MD:  Aspen Publishers, Inc.
 Krantz JC Jr., New Drugs and the Kefauver–Harris Amendment, J New Drugs, 1966, Mar-Apr;6(22):77-9
 Krantz JC Jr., The Kefauver-Harris amendment after sixteen years, Mil Med. 1978 Dec;143(12):883.

External links
50 Years: The Kefauver-Harris Amendments from the U.S. Food and Drug Administration
Drug Amendments Act of 1962, Enrolled Acts and Resolutions of Congress at the U.S. National Archives and Records Administration

Pharmaceuticals policy
United States federal health legislation
1962 in American law